8306 Shoko, provisional designation , is a Florian asteroid and a synchronous binary system from the inner regions of the asteroid belt, approximately  in diameter. It was discovered on 24 February 1995, by Japanese astronomer Akimasa Nakamura at the Kuma Kogen Astronomical Observatory in southern Japan, who named it after Japanese singer-songwriter Shoko Sawada. The likely S-type asteroid has a rotation period of 3.35 hours. The discovery of its 1.3-kilometer minor-planet moon was announced in December 2013.

Orbit and classification 

Shoko is a member of the Flora family, a giant asteroid family and the largest family of stony asteroids in the main-belt. It orbits the Sun in the inner asteroid belt at a distance of 1.7–2.7 AU once every 3 years and 4 months (1,225 days; semi-major axis of 2.24 AU). Its orbit has an eccentricity of 0.22 and an inclination of 5° with respect to the ecliptic.

Physical characteristics 

Shoko is an assumed, stony S-type asteroid, which is also the overall spectral type of the Florian asteroids. It has an absolute magnitude between 14.83 and 15.28.

Rotation period 

In September and October 2013, two rotational lightcurves of Shoko were obtained from photometric observations by astronomers Petr Pravec and David Polishook. Lightcurve analysis gave a well-defined rotation period of 3.3503 and 3.604 hours with a low brightness amplitude of 0.11 and 0.10 magnitude, respectively.

Diameter and albedo 

The Collaborative Asteroid Lightcurve Link assumes an albedo of 0.24 – derived from 8 Flora, the parent body of the Flora family – and calculates a diameter of 2.38 kilometers based on an absolute magnitude of 15.28, while the Johnston's Archive estimates a diameter 3.21.

Satellite 

The discovery was announced in December 2013. The mutual occultation events suggest the presence of a satellite with a diameter  or more than 40% the size of its primary. The discoverers also suspect that there might be a possible third body, which would make it a rare trinary asteroid. As of 2018, no follow-up observations have been conducted.

Naming 

This minor planet was named by the discoverer after Japanese singer-songwriter of ballads and pop songs, Shoko Sawada (born 1962), who has recorded a large number of studio albums since her debut in 1979. The official naming citation was published by the Minor Planet Center on 10 June 1998.

References

External links 
 Asteroids with Satellites, Robert Johnston, johnstonsarchive.net
 Asteroid Lightcurve Database (LCDB), query form (info )
 Dictionary of Minor Planet Names, Google books
 Discovery Circumstances: Numbered Minor Planets (5001)-(10000) – Minor Planet Center
 
 

008306
Discoveries by Akimasa Nakamura
Named minor planets
008306
19950224